The Ancient Monuments Act 1900 was an Act of the Parliament of the United Kingdom that aimed to improve the protection afforded to ancient monuments in Britain.

Details
The Ancient Monuments Protection Act 1882 had begun the process of establishing legal protection for Britain's ancient monuments; these had all been prehistoric sites, such as ancient tumuli. By the turn of the century, the scope of the earlier legislation was felt to be insufficient, and the Ancient Monuments Act empowered the government's Commissioners of Work and local county councils to protect a wider range of properties. The act also allowed these groups to provide public access to ancient monuments, and to financially assist with their conservation.

Consequences

The Ancient Monuments Protection Act 1910 expanded on the 1900 act. In 1913, gaps in the legislation between the protection ascribed to monuments under the three previous acts led to the a royal commission and the passing of the additional Ancient Monuments Consolidation and Amendment Act 1913.

See also
List of prehistoric structures in Great Britain
Reproduced text of Ancient Monuments Protection Act 1900

References

Bibliography
Mynors, Charles. (2006) Listed Buildings, Conservation Areas and Monuments. London: Sweet and Maxwell. .

United Kingdom Acts of Parliament 1900
Archaeology of the United Kingdom
Historic preservation legislation
Conservation in the United Kingdom